Tlumačov is a municipality and village in Zlín District in the Zlín Region of the Czech Republic. It has about 2,400 inhabitants.

History
The first written mention of Tlumačov is from 1141.

References

Villages in Zlín District